Anastasiya Juravleva (also spelled Zhuravlyeva, née Kirbyateva, born 9 October 1981 in Tashkent) is an Uzbekistani triple jumper and long jumper.

Competition record

Personal bests
Long jump – 6.69 m (2003)
Triple jump – 14.55 m (2005) – current national record.

References

1981 births
Living people
Sportspeople from Tashkent
Uzbekistani female triple jumpers
Uzbekistani female long jumpers
Athletes (track and field) at the 2004 Summer Olympics
Athletes (track and field) at the 2008 Summer Olympics
Athletes (track and field) at the 2012 Summer Olympics
Olympic athletes of Uzbekistan
Asian Games medalists in athletics (track and field)
Athletes (track and field) at the 2006 Asian Games
Athletes (track and field) at the 2010 Asian Games
Athletes (track and field) at the 2014 Asian Games
Asian Games silver medalists for Uzbekistan
Medalists at the 2006 Asian Games
21st-century Uzbekistani women